Kerala Kaumudi is a Malayalam language daily newspaper published from Kerala, India. It was founded in  1911 by C. V. Kunhiraman as a periodical. His son K. Sukumaran later served as the newspaper's editor. Kerala Kaumudi Daily is among the largest circulated newspapers in Malayalam with 9 editions in Thiruvananthapuram, Kollam, Alappuzha, Pathanamthitta, Kottayam, Kochi, Thrissur, Kozhikode and Kannur besides being circulated in the United Arab Emirates.

In the course of over a century, Kerala Kaumudi has diversified and expanded into a multitude of media platforms. In addition to the daily, Kerala Kaumudi comprises a midday named Kerala Kaumudi Flash, the Kerala Kaumudi Weekly, the children's magazine Magic Slate, the glossy film magazine Flash Movies, an online edition of the newspaper and the television channel Kaumudy TV. Kerala Kaumudi Weekly, formerly edited by K. Balakrishnan, remained as a popular literary journal in Kerala for a long period.

The company also runs Kaumudy TV, a news and entertainment channel. Kaumudy TV is available all over India, the United States, Europe and the Middle East.

Editions 
Kerala Kaumudi is printed from Thiruvananthapuram, Kollam, Alappuzha, Kottayam, Kochi, Pathanamthitta, Thrissur, Kozhikode, Kannur in Kerala and Bangalore.

See also 
Kaumudy TV

References

External links 

Malayalam edition
English edition

Malayalam-language newspapers
Daily newspapers published in India
Mass media in Thiruvananthapuram
1911 establishments in India
Newspapers established in 1911